The Dodge MAXXcab is a four-door sport utility pickup truck concept car developed by Dodge. Unveiled at the 2000 Detroit Auto Show, it was billed by Dodge as a "Passenger Priority Truck". It shares styling cues from other vehicles in the Dodge and Chrysler line up, and is based on a modified Dodge Dakota chassis. It features nimble, sedan-like handling, a shortened utility bed, and a minivan style interior with seating for five people, the rear bench having built in child seats. It is powered by Dodge's 4.7L Magnum V-8, mated to a multi-speed electronic automatic transmission. While not intended for production, the MAXXcab did showcase features that were to be found on subsequent Dodge products, such as the idea of making a pickup truck more centered on the passengers was utilized in the Dodge Ram Mega Cab, which was available starting in the 2006 model year. 

 

MAXXcab